Eyal Gordin is an American cinematographer and television director.

Born and raised in Israel, to a Jewish family. He moved to the U.S. in 1984. 

He began his career as a camera operator working on the films Kansas (1988), Highway to Hell (1992) and Kalifornia (1993). Before working in the television series Babylon 5, Buffy the Vampire Slayer and Freaks and Geeks.

He eventually made his directorial debut directing an episode of The Division, later amassing directing credits for series My Name Is Earl, Everybody Hates Chris, Jonas, Zeke and Luther and Raising Hope.

Gordin is also the founding farmer of Lemon Acres, LLC, a lemon farm located in Moorpark, California, founded in 2004.

Directing credits
From 2004 to present:
The Division 
Everybody Hates Chris 
My Name Is Earl
Worst Week
Jonas
Raising Hope
Friends with Benefits
Man Up
The Middle

References

External links

American cinematographers
Farmers from California
American television directors
Living people
People from Moorpark, California
Year of birth missing (living people)
American people of Israeli descent